List of Osaka Metro stations lists all of the stations in the Osaka Metro and includes the station's name, picture, metro lines serving that station, location (ward or city), design, and daily usage. The Osaka Metro consists of eight subway lines and one automated people mover, with a total of 133 stations (108 stations counting interchange stations, served by multiple lines, only once). The system mainly serves the city of Osaka, as well as Higashiosaka, Kadoma, Moriguchi, Sakai, Suita, and Yao.

Overview
The first section of the Osaka Metro (formerly known as the Osaka Municipal Subway) opened on May 20, 1933, between Umeda Station and Shinsaibashi Station on the Midosuji Line. The line was 138.7 km long.

The reported daily usage is the total of boarding and alighting passengers at each station from a ridership survey conducted on Tuesday, 14 November 2017. With respect to "interface" station for through services, only subway ridership are included. Osaka Metro considers Shinsaibashi Station and Yotsubashi Station to be the same station for the daily usage figures.

Stations

References

Osaka Municipal Subway
Osaka Metro
Osaka Metro stations
Japanese railway-related lists
Japan transport-related lists
Transport in Osaka Prefecture